Artemisia filifolia,  known by common names including sand sagebrush, sand sage  and sandhill sage, is a species of flowering plant in the aster family. It is native to North America, where it occurs  from Nevada east to South Dakota and from there south to Arizona, Chihuahua, and Texas.

Description
The leaves are sometimes split into segments. They are solitary or arranged in fascicles. The inflorescence is a panicle of hanging flower heads. Each head contains sterile disc florets and 2 to 3 fertile ray florets. The fruit is a tiny achene. The achenes do not tend to disperse far from the parent plant.

Ecology
Artemisia filifolia is a dominant species across much of the west-central United States, particularly in areas where the substrate is a deep, sandy soil. It is an indicator of sandy soils. It is efficient for preventing erosion on such soils. It is common in parts of the Great Plains, where it is a dominant component of prairie, grassland, and shrubland ecosystems alongside grasses such as sand bluestem, grama grasses, sand reedgrass, little bluestem, and sand dropseed. Some regions dominated by this sagebrush include the occurrences of the sandsage prairie from Nebraska to central Texas, various river systems in eastern Colorado and Kansas, the sandhills and mixed-grass prairies of Colorado, and parts of southeastern Wyoming. In Texas, it is common in the Trans-Pecos region, where it grows with honey mesquite, and many other areas in the state where it grows with sand shinnery oak.

This ecosystem is most commonly affected by fire and grazing. Before modern fire suppression, the ecosystem was maintained by a pattern of disturbance caused by natural wildfire and grazing by bison, a pattern which is called pyric herbivory.

Rangeland impact
When humans began to use this terrain as rangeland, this system was altered, causing a homogenization of life forms in the habitat. A balanced regime of fire and grazing is required to sustain the biodiversity of this type of rangeland. Fire also helps prevent the succession of woody vegetation onto shrublands. The sagebrush is tolerant of fire, resprouting vigorously after its aboveground parts are burned away.

Ecosystem
Sand sagebrush ecosystems are important habitat types for many animals. Prairie dogs build towns in sandy sage grassland, and when they abandon them, burrowing owls move in. Sage grouse live in sand sagebrush, though they prefer big sagebrush. Some animals eat the seeds, such as lesser prairie chickens and scaled quail. Lesser prairie chickens also use it for cover and nesting purposes. Extensive removal of sand sagebrush has been shown to reduce the diversity and abundance of breeding birds in the habitat.

Despite its importance in numerous ecosystems, this sagebrush can become a troublesome weed. One method of control is burning, then placing livestock where they will graze the new sprouts as they come up. It is also controlled with herbicides and mowing.

Commercial use
Sand sagebrush seed is sold commercially. It is sometimes used for revegetation efforts on rangeland and coal fields. The Navajo had several uses for the plant. It was used medicinally and for ritual purposes. Being quite soft, it was used as toilet paper.

References

External links
Medicinal Plants of the Southwest
Southwest Colorado Wildflowers
Utah State University, Range Plants of Utah
United States Department of the Interior, National Park Service, Arches National Park, Old Man Sage (Old-man Sagebrush; Sand Sage; Sand Sagebrush)
Oklahoma Biological Survey

filifolia
Plants described in 1828
Plants used in traditional Native American medicine
Flora of North America